Airdrie and Shotts may refer to:

 Airdrie and Shotts (UK Parliament constituency)
 Airdrie and Shotts (Scottish Parliament constituency)